Begum Shaista Suhrawardy Ikramullah (22 July 1915 – 11 December 2000) was a Bengali Pakistani politician from Bengal, diplomat and author. She was the first Muslim woman to earn a PhD from the University of London. She was Pakistan's ambassador to Morocco from 1964 to 1967, and was also a delegate to the United Nations.

Family and education
Ikramullah was born as Shaista Akhtar Banu Suhrawardy into the Suhrawardy family to Hassan Suhrawardy and his wife Sahibzadi Shah Banu Begum. Sahista's mother was Nawab Abdul Latif's granddaughter.

She studied at Loreto College, Kolkata. She was also the first Muslim woman to earn a PhD from the University of London. Her doctorate thesis, "Development of the Urdu Novel and Short Story", was a critical survey of Urdu literature.

Marriage and children
She married Mohammed Ikramullah in 1933. They had four children:
 Inam Ikramullah
 Naz Ashraf
 Salma Sobhan
 Princess Sarvath of Jordan

Political career
After she was married, she was one of the first Indian Muslim women in her generation to leave purdah. Muhammad Ali Jinnah inspired her to be involved in politics. She was a leader in the Muslim Women Student's Federation and the All-India Muslim League's Women's Sub-Committee.

In 1945, she was asked by the Government of India to attend the Pacific Relations Conference. Jinnah convinced her not to accept the offer, as he wanted her to go as the representative of the Muslim League and to speak on its behalf.

She was elected to the Constituent Assembly of India in 1946, but never took the seat, as Muslim League politicians did not.

She was one of two female representatives at the first Constituent Assembly of Pakistan in 1947.

She was also a delegate to the United Nations, and worked on the Universal Declaration of Human Rights (1948) and the Convention Against Genocide (1951).

She was Pakistan's Ambassador to Morocco from 1964 to 1967.

Publications
She wrote for Tehzeeb-e-Niswan and Ismat, both Urdu women's magazines, and later wrote for English-language newspapers. In 1950 her collection of short stories, called Koshish-e-Natamaam, was published. In 1951 her book Letters to Neena was published; it is a collection of ten open letters supposedly written to Indians, who are personified as a woman called Neena. The real Neena was one of her in-laws. After the Partition of India, she wrote about Islam for the government, and those essays were eventually published as Beyond the Veil (1953). Her autobiography, From Purdah to Parliament (1963), is her best-known writing; she translated it into Urdu to make it more accessible. In 1991 her book Huseyn Shaheed Suhrawardy: A Biography, about her uncle, was published. She also was one of the eight writers of the book Common Heritage (1997), about India and Pakistan. In her last days, she completed an English translation of Mirat ul Uroos and an Urdu volume on Kahavat aur Mahavray. In 2005 her collection of women's sayings and idioms in Urdu, called Dilli ki khavatin ki kahavatain aur muhavare, was posthumously published. She also wrote Safarnama, in Urdu.

Death
She died on 11 December 2000, in Karachi, at age 85.

Awards and recognition
In 2002, President of Pakistan posthumously gave her the highest civil award, Nishan-i-Imtiaz (Order of Excellence) award.

References

External links 
 Find Articles: The London – Begum Shaista Ikramullah (29 March 2001)
 The Daily Star – Salma Sobhan

1915 births
2000 deaths
Suhrawardy family
All India Muslim League members
Ambassadors of Pakistan to Morocco
Politicians from Kolkata
Loreto College, Kolkata alumni
University of Calcutta alumni
Members of the Constituent Assembly of Pakistan
Writers from Karachi
Politicians from Karachi
20th-century Pakistani women writers
Alumni of SOAS University of London
Pakistani people of Bengali descent
Pakistani MNAs 1947–1954
Pakistani women ambassadors
Recipients of Nishan-e-Imtiaz
20th-century Bengalis
20th-century Pakistani women politicians